Hilton Kelley is a former American actor and environmentalist from Port Arthur, Texas. He was awarded the Goldman Environmental Prize in 2011, for his fight against pollution of the  Port Arthur district from petrochemical industry and waste facilities.

References 

Date of birth unknown
Living people
People from Port Arthur, Texas
American environmentalists
Goldman Environmental Prize awardees
Year of birth missing (living people)